Vander Ark is a surname. Notable people with the surname include:

Brian Vander Ark, lead singer of the Verve Pipe
Brad Vander Ark, bass guitarist of the Verve Pipe
Jon Vander Ark, American business executive, president of Republic Services
Steven Vander Ark, librarian, creator of the Harry Potter Lexicon website